Naiyarat Thanawaigoses, nicknamed Pang (born ) is a Thai YouTuber, known for video game live streaming on her YouTube channel, zbing z. She began making videos in 2014, and has since become one of the most popular live streamers in Thailand, with over 15 million subscribers as of 28 October 2021.

References

Naiyarat Thanawaigoses
1991 births
Year of birth uncertain
Living people